Hippopodinidae is a family of bryozoans belonging to the order Cheilostomatida.

Genera:
 Archoporella Guha & Gopikrishna, 2005
 Hippopodina Levinsen, 1909
 Saevitella Bobies, 1956
 Thornelya Harmer, 1957
 Trilochites Hayward, 1991

References

Cheilostomatida